Elis Ligtlee (born 28 June 1994) is a Dutch track cyclist. She represented her nation at the 2014 and 2015 UCI Track Cycling World Championships. She won the gold medal in the keirin race at the 2016 Summer Olympics. Following her Olympic victory, Ligtlee was officially inducted to the Knight of the Order of Orange-Nassau.

Major results

2013
Revolution
1st Sprint – Round 2, Glasgow
2nd Keirin – Round 2, Glasgow
UEC European U23 Track Championships
1st  Team Sprint (with Shanne Braspennincx)
1st  500m Time Trial
3rd Sprint
Grand Prix Sprint Apeldoorn
2nd Sprint
3rd Keirin
2014
1st Sprint, Revolution – Round 3, Manchester
1st Sprint, Champions of Sprint
Festival of Speed
1st Sprint
2nd Keirin
Open des Nations sur Piste de Roubaix
1st Keirin
2nd Sprint
2nd Team Sprint (with Shanne Braspennincx)
UEC European U23 Track Championships
1st  Keirin
2nd  Sprint
2nd  Team Sprint (with Yesna Rijkhoff)
3rd  500m Time Trial
UEC European Track Championships
2nd 500m Time Trial
3rd Team Sprint (with Shanne Braspennincx)
2nd Sprint, US Sprint GP
2nd Team Sprint, Cottbuser Nächte (with Shanne Braspennincx)
2nd Sprint, Track-Cycling Challenge Grenchen
Sprintermeeting
2nd Sprint
3rd Keirin
2015
UEC European Track Championships
1st  Keirin
1st  Sprint
2nd  500m Time Trial
3rd  Team Sprint (with Laurine van Riessen)
1st Sprint, US Sprint GP
1st Sprint, Festival of Speed
2nd Sprint, Open des Nations sur Piste de Roubaix
UEC European U23 Track Championships
2nd  Sprint
2nd  500m Time Trial
3rd  Keirin
3rd  Team Sprint (with Kyra Lamberink)
3rd Keirin, Fastest Man on Wheels

2016
1st  Keirin, Olympic Games
UEC European U23 Track Championships
1st  Keirin
1st  Sprint
1st  Team Sprint (with Kyra Lamberink)
1st  500m Time Trial
1st Keirin, Oberhausen
1st Sprint, Öschelbronn
1st Sprint, Dudenhofen
  3rd Sprint, UCI World Track Cycling Championships
2017
2nd Sprint, Belgian International Track Meeting
3rd Sprint, Internationaal Baan Sprint Keirin Toernooi
3rd Keirin, Troféu Internacional de Anadia

References

External links

 
 
 
 
 
 
 
 

1994 births
Living people
Dutch female cyclists
Dutch track cyclists
Sportspeople from Deventer
Cyclists from Overijssel
Olympic cyclists of the Netherlands
Cyclists at the 2016 Summer Olympics
Olympic gold medalists for the Netherlands
Medalists at the 2016 Summer Olympics
Olympic medalists in cycling
Knights of the Order of Orange-Nassau
21st-century Dutch women